Chigari is a rural locality (a khutor) in Khopyorskoye Rural Settlement, Novonikolayevsky District, Volgograd Oblast, Russia. The population was 304 as of 2010. There are 6 streets.

Geography 
Chigari is located in steppe, on the Khopyorsko-Buzulukskaya Plain, 21 km northeast of Novonikolayevsky (the district's administrative centre) by road. Novokardailsky is the nearest rural locality.

References 

Rural localities in Novonikolayevsky District